Petri Partanen (born February 26, 1986) is a Finnish former professional ice hockey forward.

Partanen played three games in the SM-liiga for KalPa during the 2006–07 season where he scored no points. He also played in Mestis for KooKoo and D Team.

References

External links

1986 births
Living people
Finnish ice hockey forwards
Iisalmen Peli-Karhut players
JYP-Akatemia players
KalPa players
KooKoo players
People from Kuopio
Sportspeople from North Savo